Acrapex spoliata is a species of moth of the family Noctuidae first described by Francis Walker in 1863. It is found in Africa, including Sierra Leone and South Africa.

The wingspan is 22–24 mm.

Description
Head and thorax ochreous tinged with rufous and mixed with some dark brown: palpi with the 2nd joint brown at sides; abdomen dorsally dark brown, ventrally ochreous tinged with rufous. Forewing ochreous tinged with rufous, the costal area suffused with dark brown leaving slight pale streaks on the veins; the median nervure and base of veins arising from it streaked with black-brown; a black-brown streak in and beyond lower angle of cell with white points on it before and beyond the angle; a diffused oblique black-brown shade from termen below apex to vein 3; a terminal series of slight black lunules: cilia dark brown mixed with ochreous. Hindwing red brown; cilia whitish at tips; the underside grey suffused with fuscous, traces of a dark discoidal spot and diffused curved postmedial line.

References

External links

Xyleninae
Moths of Sub-Saharan Africa
Lepidoptera of Uganda
Lepidoptera of Southern Africa
Moths described in 1863
Lepidoptera of West Africa